Håkan Karlsson (born 30 July 1958) is a Swedish former cyclist. He competed in the team time trial event at the 1980 Summer Olympics.

References

External links
 

1958 births
Living people
Swedish male cyclists
Olympic cyclists of Sweden
Cyclists at the 1980 Summer Olympics
Sportspeople from Västra Götaland County